Stacy Smith is a news anchor.

Stacy Smith may also refer to:

Stacy Smith (actress) in Marion Bridge (film)
Stacy Smith (pageant contestant) in Miss Virgin Islands

See also
Stacey Smith (disambiguation)